No Sleep is the only studio album recorded by German girl group LaViVe, released on 17 December 2010 on digital and physical formats by Starwatch Music. LaViVe was formed on the ninth installment of the German adaption of the international television talent show Popstars in 2010, and consisted of four members. Musically, No Sleep was described as a dance-pop album with Eurodance influences. Several covers were recorded for the album of material released by Romanian acts Akcent, Corina, Connect-R and Fly Project, as well as by American singer John Michael Montgomery.

Music critics met No Sleep with mixed reviews, widely noting its lack of profundity, but pointing out the tracks "Keep On", "Hurtful" and "I Swear" as highlights. Commercially, the record attained minor success, reaching the top 50 in Germany and Austria, and the top 100 in Switzerland. No Sleep was aided by the release of one single, "No Time for Sleeping" (2010), which peaked within the top 30 in the aforementioned countries. "I Swear" was also made available as a promotional single to minor success in Germany.

Background and composition 

German girl group LaViVe was formed on the ninth installment of the German adaption of the international television talent show Popstars in 2010, consisting of Meike Ehnert, Sarah Rensing, Julia Köster and Katrin Mehlberg. Their debut and sole studio album No Sleep was released on digital and physical formats on 17 December 2010 by Starwatch Music in Germany.

No Sleep has been described as a mainstream-fashioned dance-pop album with eurodance influences. Its opening track "How Deep Is Your Love" is a cover of Romanian group Akcent's 2010 single of the same name. Musically, it is an uptempo eurodance-influenced song containing an accordion and synthesizers in its instrumentation; LaViVe's vocals are processed with various filters. It is followed by "No Time for Sleeping", a cover of Romanian singer Corina's 2010 single "No Sleepin'", which is a synthpop-influenced uptempo dance song featuring discreet piano and a prominent clink sound. "Keep On" and "Hurtful" are similarly both dance recordings. Other songs covered by LaViVe for No Sleep are "Burning Love" (2009) by Romanian singer Connect-R, "Unisex" (2009) by Romanian duo Fly Project and "I Swear" (1993) by American artist John Michael Montgomery. The latter features vocals from the final eleven contestants of the ninth installment of Popstars, credited as "Popstars".

Reception 
Upon its release, No Sleep was met with mixed response from music critics.
Josef Gasteiger of German magazine Laut criticized the album's content and its lyrics as "boring", while pointing out the lack of profundity and stating that the songs sounded like demo versions. He further suggested that "Keep On" and "Hurtful" would have sounded better as ballads, and picked "I Swear" as the highlight on the album. Christopher Polusik, writing for T-Online, negatively commented on how the short recording impacted on the album's production. He lauded the tracks "Keep On", "Hurtful" and "I Swear" for showcasing LaViVe's vocals.

Commercially, No Sleep attained minor success on record charts. In Germany, the record debuted and peaked at number 44, leaving after four weeks. It also reached number two on GfK Entertainment's Newcomer component chart. No Sleep debuted at number 47 in Austria and climbed to its peak position at number 42 the next week, exiting the ranking after a total of four editions. The record further reached position 83 in Switzerland in its sole charting week. One single has been released from No Sleep, "No Time for Sleeping", which reached the top 30 in the aforementioned countries. "I Swear" was also promotionally made available, peaking at number 69 in Germany.

Track listing 
Credits adapted from the liner notes of No Sleep.

Charts

Release history

References 

2010 debut albums